Shamar or Shemar is a given name. Notable people with the name include:

Shemar Moore (born 1970), American actor
Shamar Bailey (born 1982), American martial artist
Shamar Sands (born 1985), Bahamian track and field athlete
Shamar Stephen (born 1991), American football player
Shamar Springer (born 1997), Barbadian cricketer
Shamar Nicholson (born 1997), Jamaican footballer
Shemar Jean-Charles (born 1998), American football player

See also
Shamarh Brooks (born 1998), West Indian cricketer
Shemar Moore (born 1970), American actor